Esfahan Kalateh (also Romanized as Eşfahān Kalāteh) is a village in Estarabad-e Jonubi Rural District, in the Central District of Gorgan County, Golestan Province, Iran. At the 2006 census, its population was 876, in 249 families.

References 

Populated places in Gorgan County